The Islamic Consultative Assembly News Agency (ICANA) is a government news agency in Iran opened in 2009. Its purpose is to cover a variety of political, social, economic, and international subjects along with other fields
There are twenty journalists working in this news agency.

References

External links
Iran says it owns more uranium than needed
Iran Denies Halt to 20 Percent Uranium Enrichment
Final nuclear agreement seems impossible before deadline, Iran says

News agencies based in Iran
Government of Iran
2009 establishments in Iran